173rd meridian may refer to:

173rd meridian east, a line of longitude east of the Greenwich Meridian
173rd meridian west, a line of longitude west of the Greenwich Meridian